Senator Cutts may refer to:

Charles Cutts (1769–1846), U.S. Senator for New Hampshire
Marsena E. Cutts (1833–1883), Iowa State Senate